Shane Meehan (born 2002) is an Irish hurler who plays for Clare Senior Championship club Banner and at inter-county level with the Clare senior hurling team.

Career

A member of the Banner club in Ennis, Meehan first came to prominence as a dual player at juvenile and underage levels and as a schoolboy with Rice College. He made his first appearance on the inter-county scene as a dual player with the Clare minor teams in 2018. Meehan captained the minor footballers the following season and was the minor hurling team's top scorer. He ended the 2019 season as Munster Minor Footballer of the Year, while he was also named on the Minor Hurling Team of the Year. Meehan subsequently progressed to under-20 level where he continued as a dual player. He joined the Clare senior hurling team in 2021.

Career statistics

Honours

Awards
Munster Minor Football of the Year: 2019
GAA Minor Star Hurling Team of the Year Award: 2019

References

2002 births
Living people
Clare inter-county hurlers